Kori Khela is an Indian Bengali language drama television series broadcasting on the Bengali general entertainment channel Zee Bangla and is also available on the digital platform ZEE5. It has been premiered on 8 March 2021 and starred by Sriparna Roy and Ananda Ghosh. The series is being produced by Sumeet Hukamchand Mittal under the banner of Shashi Sumeet Productions. It is remake of Zee TV series Punar Vivaah - Zindagi Milegi Dobara.

Plot
The story centers on Pari and Apurba. Pari, a widow lady (who wasn’t actually widow which she get to know later) and independent single mother, who lives with her son Kuttush. Her mother-in-law wants her to remarry, but she disagrees. She meets Apurba who seems to be responsible by nature. Whether Pari gives herself a second chance or not, makes the rest of the story.

Apurba and Pari marry, thinking about their children who need proper parenting. At first Srija couldn't accept Paromita but as time passes and when Paromita saves Srija from the trap of the false Shantanu by giving her life at stake she understands how much Pari loves her and accepts her. Soon, Anu comes to Ganguly house to accompany Srija and forms a nice bond with Pari. Also, Chaitali accepts Paromita as her daughter-in-law and regards her as the Laxmi of their house. Anu along with Aniket, Subhra, Misty, Tonni and Souvik plans to make Apurbo and Paromita closer for which Anu intentionally gets closer to Apurbo so that Paromita becomes jealous and confesses her rights of being his wife. They also reveal their plan to Chaitali who also promises to keep it a secret. Later Ganguly family members opens a cafe but Ritu oppessos as she was having external martial affair with Jayanta who was also running a cafe. She and Joyonto fears that her cafe might affect his cafe. Later then plans many things to stop her cafe but fails. At last Ritu mixes a chemical powder to Pori's food and she goes to jail. Later she gets bailed as all the truth gets revealed. Ritu and Joyonto gets arrested although Ritu was bailed. Later Sutapa and Ani refuse to keep Ritu at their home. Ani divorces Ritu and Ritu tries to brainwash Sutapa against Paromita but fails to do so.

Cast

Main
 Sriparna Roy as Paromita Ganguly (née Sengupta, formerly Mitra) aka Pari: Himangshu's former wife and Apurba's second wife, Kuttus's mother, Srija and Gunja's step-mother. She is a cake seller by profession and also owns Veranda Café
 Ananda Ghosh as Apurba Ganguly: Atreyee's widower, Paromita's second husband, Srija and Gunja's father, Kuttus's step-father
 Jishnu Bhattacharya as Arjo Ganguly (formerly Mitra) aka Kuttus: Himanshu and Paromita's son, Apurba's step-son
 Srija Bhattacharjee as Gunja Ganguly: Atreyee and Apurba's younger daughter, Pari's step-daughter, Vicky's best friend and love interest
 Beas Dhar as Srija Ganguly: Atreyee and Apurba's eldest daughter, Pari's step-daughter

Recurring
 Mou Bhattacharya as Chitra Mitra (née Bose): Himanshu's mother, Pari's mother-in-law, Kuttus's grandmother
 Raj Bhattacharya as Himangsu Mitra / Pushkar Barua: Pari's first husband, Kuttush's father and Chitra's son.(returned several years later undergoing face surgery)
 Saibal Bhattacharya as Nilankur Barua: Paromita's customer and Himangu's adoptive father after face surgery, Pushkar's "Debota".
 Sarbani Chatterjee as Sumi: Tonni's mother, Chitra's sister.
 Priyanka Chakrabarty as Late Atreyee Ganguly: Apurba's first wife, Srija and Gunja's biological mother and Annwesha's elder sister
 Tanuka Chatterjee as Chaitali Ganguly: Apurba, Souvik and Subhra's mother, Paromita's second mother-in-law; Aniket and Misty's aunt
 Manishankar Banerjee as Anumoy Ganguly: Apurba, Souvik and Subhra's father; Paromita's second father-in-law; Aniket and Misty's uncle
 Shyamashis Pahari as Subinoy Ganguly: Misty and Aniket's father; Apurba, Souvik and Subhra's uncle; Ritu's father-in-law
 Rajashree Bhowmik as Sutapa Ganguly: Misty and Aniket's mother; Apurba, Souvik and Subhra's aunt; Ritu's former mother-in-law, Ananda and Anu's mother-in-law
 Twarita Chatterjee as Subhra Sinha (née Ganguly): Apurba's younger sister, Souvik's eldest sister, Misty and Aniket's cousin and Koushik's wife
 Fahim Mirza as Koushik Sinha: Subhra's husband. He also has a love relation with Annwesha.
 Prantik Banerjee / Debomoy Mukherjee as Souvik Ganguly: Chaitali and Anumoy's adopted son, Apurba and Subhra's younger brother, Misty and Aniket's cousin, Tonni's husband, a folk singer
 Ritu Rai Acharya as Tonni Ganguly (née Mukherjee): Pari's sister-in-law and Souvik's wife.
 Soumi Banerjee as Annwesha aka Anu; Aniket's second wife, late Atreyee's younger sister, Srija and Gunja's aunt. She is in a love relation with Koushik, unaware that he is married to Subhra, but later she learns the truth and exposes Koushik.
 Neil Chatterjee as Aniket Ganguly aka Ani: Ritu's former husband, Anu's husband, Subinoy and Sutapa's son, Misty's brother; Apurba, Souvik and Subhra's cousin
 Hridlekha Banerjee as Ritu: Aniket's former  wife. She is having an extra-marital affair with Jayanta and she opposes Paromita's café.
 Subhajit Banerjee as Jayanta Chowdhury: Ritu's secret lover, owner of Cuppa Café, Paromita's business rival
 Bhavana Banerjee as Misty Ganguly: Subinoy and Sutapa's daughter, Aniket's sister; Apurba, Souvik and Subhra's cousin; Ananda's wife
 Rahul Mukherjee as Ananda: Misty's husband
 Arunava Dey as Rony / fake Santanu Choudhury: a terrorist
 Ayush Das as Vicky: Srija's best friend and love interest 
 Suchandrima as Sharbani Roy: Vicky's aunt; Paromita's lawyer
 Suman Banerjee as Shibesh Bhattacharya: Himanshu's Lawyer
 Madhupriya Chowdhury as an anchor of Byabsayi Bouma reality show
 Namita Chakrabarty as Nandini Chakrabarty: Atreyee and Annwesha's mother
 Debopriya Basu as Pupu: Vicky's new friend

References

External links
 Kori Khela on ZEE5

Bengali-language television programming in India
Zee Bangla original programming
2021 Indian television series debuts